Serbia competed at the 2014 Summer Youth Olympics, in Nanjing, China from 16 August to 28 August 2014. The Olympic Committee of Serbia confirmed that the country will be represented by 24 athletes in 12 sports. The Serbian flag at the opening ceremony was carried by tennis player Ivana Jorović.

Medalists
Medals awarded to participants of mixed-NOC (Combined) teams are represented in italics. These medals are not counted towards the individual NOC medal tally.

Athletics

Serbia qualified two athletes.

Qualification Legend: Q=Final A (medal); qB=Final B (non-medal); qC=Final C (non-medal); qD=Final D (non-medal); qE=Final E (non-medal)

Girls
Track & road events

Field events

Badminton

Serbia qualified one athlete based on the 2 May 2014 BWF Junior World Rankings.

Singles

Doubles

Canoeing

Serbia qualified one boat based on its performance at the 2013 World Junior Canoe Sprint and Slalom Championships.

Boys

Cycling

Serbia qualified a girls' team based on its ranking issued by the UCI. Serbia received a tripartite Invitation for boys' team.

Team

Mixed Relay

Judo

Serbia qualified two athletes based on its performance at the 2013 Cadet World Judo Championships.

Individual

Team

Rowing

Serbia qualified one quota place after the 2013 World Rowing Junior Championships.

Qualification Legend: FA=Final A (medal); FB=Final B (non-medal); FC=Final C (non-medal); FD=Final D (non-medal); SA/B=Semifinals A/B; SC/D=Semifinals C/D; R=Repechage

Shooting

Serbia qualified two shooters based on its performance at the 2014 European Shooting Championships.

Individual

Team

Swimming

Serbia qualified four swimmers.

Boys

Girls

Taekwondo

Boys

Girls

Tennis

Serbia qualified two athletes based on the 9 June 2014 ITF World Junior Rankings.

Singles

Doubles

Weightlifting

Serbia was given a reallocation spot to compete.

Boys

Wrestling

Serbia qualified one athlete based on its performance at the 2014 European Cadet Championships.

Boys

References

2014 in Serbian sport
Nations at the 2014 Summer Youth Olympics
Serbia at the Youth Olympics